"The Passion of the Jew" is the third episode of the eighth season and the 114th overall episode of the American animated series South Park,  originally broadcast on Comedy Central on March 31, 2004. Going by production order, it is the 4th episode of Season 8 instead of the 3rd. It was written and directed by Trey Parker, who, along with fellow series co-creator Matt Stone, voiced most of the characters in the episode. "The Passion of the Jew" is a satirical critique of the media discourse and controversy surrounding Mel Gibson's 2004 film, The Passion of the Christ.

In the episode, Kyle finally sees the blockbuster movie The Passion of the Christ and admits that Cartman has been right about the Jewish people all along. After Stan and Kenny see and hate the film, they angrily pursue Mel Gibson to get their money back.

Plot
The boys are playing Star Trek in Cartman's mother's new minivan and, as usual, the anti-Semitic Cartman insults Kyle's Jewish heritage. Cartman dares Kyle to watch The Passion of the Christ, the box-office success which Cartman cites as proof that everybody hates the Jews. Kyle sees the film and is horrified by its violent depiction of how Jesus was tortured and crucified.  Kyle feels intense guilt and has nightmares in which he and other Jews laugh while killing Jesus. He tells Cartman that he was "right all along" about the Jews; overjoyed, Cartman prays to a poster of The Passion'''s director Mel Gibson and vows to dedicate his life to promoting the film and "organiz[ing] the masses ... to do thy bidding". Meanwhile, Stan and Kenny watch The Passion and hate it. Declaring it a "snuff film", they demand their eighteen dollars back from the theater, but are told that they can only get their money back from Gibson.

Attempting to contact Gibson, Stan and Kenny telephone the head of the Mel Gibson Fan Club—Cartman, who yells at them for disliking the film, but lets slip that Gibson lives in Malibu. Stan and Kenny make their way there. Meanwhile Cartman dresses in a brown Hitler-esque uniform and hosts a fan club meeting in his backyard. The attendees have gathered to celebrate The Passion, which they say helped them rediscover Christianity. Cartman suggests that each attendee take one more person to see the film before they begin what he refers to as "the cleansing"—the fan club members obliviously agree.

When Stan and Kenny reach Gibson's house, the director rambles, straps himself to a rack wearing only white briefs and says that no matter how much they torture him he will never refund their money. When the boys insist that they just want their money back, Gibson chases them around the house, imitating Daffy Duck gags while doing so. Stan and Kenny take eighteen dollars from Gibson's wallet (actually twenty dollars, but Kenny offers up two dollars for change) and flee on a bus home.  Gibson, wearing face paint from Braveheart, chases their bus in the tanker truck from Mad Max 2, screaming "Qapla'!" and "Gimme back my money!" Back in South Park, Kyle talks to Father Maxi about his issues regarding Jesus and the guilt he has been feeling since seeing Gibson's film. Father Maxi points out that the Passion was originally a play used to stir up anti-Semitism, but says that its subject matter can still help people. Kyle seizes on Father Maxi's statement that "Christianity is about atonement" and says he now understands what he should do.

At another fan club rally outside the South Park theater, Cartman shouts hateful slogans in German and gives the attendees lines to shout back; mistaking the German for the Aramaic spoken in The Passion, they happily do so and join Cartman in goose-stepping through South Park shouting anti-Semitic slogans. Meanwhile, Kyle suggests at his synagogue that the Jewish community should apologize for Jesus' crucifixion, prompting uproar in the congregation. The rabbi tries to calm the situation, saying "we live in a rational community, and everybody knows this is just a movie", but just then, Cartman and his parade pass the synagogue.

Horrified, the rabbi and congregation go to the theater and demand that they stop showing The Passion. Their argument with Cartman and his followers is interrupted by the arrival of the truck chase—Gibson crashes into the theater, destroying it. When he emerges unscathed, Cartman rushes to meet him, but Gibson ignores him and, rambling, first attempts one final time to force Stan and Kenny to give him his money back (which fails, as they refuse), and then smears his own excrement on a building, much to the astonishment of Kyle and the fan club members. Stan says that if they want to be good Christians for Jesus they should focus on his teachings and not focus on how he died.  The fans agree and disperse, much to Cartman's dismay. Kyle says he feels better about being Jewish after hearing Stan's speech and seeing Gibson, who defecates on Cartman's face and runs off whooping.

Cultural references
 
The poster of Mel Gibson on Cartman's wall is from Gibson's 1995 film Braveheart. On Stan and Kenny's way out to get their money back for The Passion, Stan remarks, "This is about being able to hold bad filmmakers responsible. This is just like when we got our money back for BASEketball." BASEketball is a 1998 comedy film in which Parker and Stone starred. The way Gibson behaves while chasing Stan and Kenny through his mansion is reminiscent of Looney Tunes, particularly Daffy Duck. Gibson saying, "Two days ago, I saw a vehicle that would haul that tanker. You want to get out of here? You talk to me" is a famous quote of his Mad Max character in the 1981 film Mad Max 2: The Road Warrior. His "Qapla!" stems from the Klingon word for "success/victory” in Star Trek and was also used in Parker and Stone’s Team America: World Police.

ReceptionThe New York Times' Virginia Heffernan praised the episode, writing "Depending on whom you asked, that episode, 'The Passion of the Jew,' proved that the show's still got it or that it's made a comeback or that it's better than ever. In any case, it was good."  It was also praised by the Anti-Defamation League and the Jewish newspaper The Jewish Daily Forward, which called it "perhaps the most biting critique of 'The Passion' to date."

Home media
Besides appearing on the South Park complete eighth season DVD set, "Passion of the Jew" is also available as a standalone DVD release (which was released on DVD the same day that the DVD of the Passion of the Christ'' was released) with two bonus episodes: season six's "Red Hot Catholic Love" and season seven's "Christian Rock Hard".

References

External links

 "The Passion of the Jew" Full episode at South Park Studios
 

Cultural depictions of Adolf Hitler
Cultural depictions of Mel Gibson
Jewish comedy and humor
Television episodes about Jews and Judaism
Television episodes set in Malibu, California
Television episodes about neo-Nazism
South Park (season 8) episodes
The Passion of the Christ
Television episodes about the aftermath of The Holocaust

it:Episodi di South Park (ottava stagione)#La passione dell'ebreo